Las Matas de Santa Cruz is the largest city in the Monte Cristi province of the Dominican Republic.

Notable people
 Nelson Cruz - (b 1980) is a Dominican-American professional baseball player for the Washington Nationals.
 Antony Santos - (b 1967) is a Dominican singer, songwriter, musician, and producer. He is one of the top-selling Bachata artists of all time.
 Raulín Rodríguez (born June 16, 1971) is a Dominican singer, songwriter, musician, and producer. He is one of the first major bachata artists to have international success and popularize this style of music in the Dominican Republic.

References 

Populated places in Monte Cristi Province
Municipalities of the Dominican Republic